Bonded by Blood is a 2010 crime film directed by Sacha Bennett and starring Tamer Hassan, Vincent Regan, and Adam Deacon. It is loosely based on the Rettendon murders in 1995.

Premise
In 1995, drug suppliers and career criminals Tony Tucker, Patrick Tate and Craig Rolfe were murdered by shotgun fire, whilst waiting in a Range Rover in Rettendon, Essex. The film charts their rise to become the most prolific dealers and feared criminals in the south of England, maintaining their empire with fear and violence.

Main cast
 Tamer Hassan - Pat Tate
 Robert Fucilla - DC Havers
 Vincent Regan - Mickey Steele
 Terry Stone - Tony Tucker
 Adam Deacon - Darren Nicholls
 Neil Maskell - Craig Rolfe
 Dave Legeno - Jack Whomes
 Johnny Palmiero - Bernard O`Mahoney
 Lucy Brown - Anna Richards
 Kierston Wareing - Kate Smith
 Susie Amy - Donna Jagger
 Duncan Meadows - Vic
 Alex Macqueen - Prison Governor
 Nathan Constance - Ravi
 Michael Socha - Donny Svenson
 Christopher Fosh - Officer Hartley 
 Simon Phillips - Officer Tolands
 Christopher Ellison - Trent
 Rebecca Walsh - Mary
 Siobhan Hewlett - Julia
 Mel Mills - DCI

Similar films
The films Essex Boys (2000), Rise of the Footsoldier (2007), The Fall of the Essex Boys (2013)  and Essex Boys Retribution (2013) are also based – to varying degrees – on the Rettendon murders.

References

External links
 
 Bonded by Blood at Screen Daily

2010 films
British crime films
Films shot at Elstree Film Studios
Films shot at Pinewood Studios
Films set in the 1990s
Films set in 2000
Gateway Films films
2010 crime films
2010s English-language films
Films directed by Sacha Bennett
2010s British films